Nick Kopia Kuman is a Papua New Guinea politician. He is a Member of the National Parliament of Papua New Guinea, representing the seat of Gumine Open since 2002 as a member of People's National Congress.

Early life 
Kuman obtained a Bachelor of Applied Science (Environmental Management) with Honours from the University of Western Sydney, Australia. Prior to his election, he was employed by the National Capital District Commission for 19 years, and was the Deputy City Manager of the National Capital District.

Political career 
He was first elected to the National Parliament in the 2002 general election for Gumine Open as an Independent candidate, then joined People's National Congress. He was appointed as Minister for Culture and Tourism in the Somare/Marat cabinet from 2003 to 2004, and again from 2007 to 2012.

He was re-elected in the 2012 general election, but was declared duly elected in November 2013 following a vote recount. On 24 February 2014, he was appointed Minister for Education in the O'Neill-Dion Cabinet, and held this position for the remaining duration of O'Neill's leadership.

On 7 June 2019, he was appointed as Minister for Higher Education, Research, Science and Technology, as part of the First Marape Cabinet, replacing Pila Niningi.

References 

Members of the National Parliament of Papua New Guinea
Living people
People's National Congress (Papua New Guinea) politicians
Government ministers of Papua New Guinea
Western Sydney University alumni
Year of birth missing (living people)